Peter Rona may refer to:
 Peter Rona (physician), Hungarian German Jewish physician and physiologist
 Peter A. Rona, American oceanographer
 Péter Róna, Hungarian economist and lawyer